Socialist Party Scotland is the Scottish affiliate of the worldwide Marxist and Trotskyist organisation the Committee for a Workers' International. Socialist Party Scotland is the sister party of the Socialist Party in England and Wales. Socialist Party Scotland plays a leading role in the Trade Unionist and Socialist Coalition (TUSC), which stood ten candidates in Scotland at the 2015 general election and the 2016 Scottish Parliament election. Four of the ten Scottish TUSC candidates in 2015 were members of Socialist Party Scotland. TUSC did not stand candidates in the 2017 UK General Election or the 2019 UK General Election as it supported Jeremy Corbyn as leader of the UK Labour Party. TUSC stood in the 2017 council elections in Scotland alongside Dundee Against Cuts.

Originally known as the Militant and Militant Tendency, and active as a Marxist grouping inside the British Labour Party in the 1970s and 1980s, Socialist Party Scotland is descended from Scottish Militant Labour, which formed the Scottish Socialist Alliance in 1996 after a debate among CWI members in Scotland on what sort of organisation to form. The SSA was launched as a broad left formation that was not affiliated with the CWI but within which Scottish Militant Labour, renamed the International Socialist Movement took a leading role.

In 1998 the SSA became the Scottish Socialist Party. The ISM's majority increasingly became estranged from the CWI and ultimately voted to disaffiliate from it in 2002. This resulted in pro-CWI members of the ISM leaving to form the International Socialists.

In August 2006 the International Socialists declared their intention to leave the SSP and join forces with a new grouping, led by Tommy Sheridan and involving also the Socialist Workers Party, called Solidarity – Scotland's Socialist Movement (more commonly, just Solidarity). In June 2010 the group changed its name to the Socialist Party Scotland.

At the start of 2015 Solidarity faced its own split as Socialist Party Scotland withdrew its support for the party and said that Sheridan had moved to the right when he and Solidarity called for a vote for the SNP at the 2015 general election.

In 2017 Socialist Party Scotland was publicly attacked during the Scottish Labour leadership election by the Anas Sarwar campaign over its critical support for Richard Leonard.

Campaigns 
In August 2007 members of the International Socialists played a leading role in the strike by more than 600 Glasgow social workers in support of their claim for higher grading, which they won. In 2015 they again played a leading role in the Glasgow homeless caseworkers' victorious strike, and were vocal in their support of the Dundee porters' successful strike against NHS Tayside. Socialist Party Scotland members have also played leading roles in campaigns such as Youth Fight for Jobs. The Party fully supported the successful campaign against the bedroom tax.

Trade Unions
Socialist Party Scotland members are on the national executives of PCS and Unison. They are also in leading positions in Dundee City Unison, Glasgow City Unison, CWU Scotland number two branch and EIS West Dunbartonshire.

Independence Referendum 2014
The party called for a Yes vote in the 2014 Scottish independence referendum, but campaigned separately from the official campaign, running meetings across the country as part of the Hope Over Fear socialist case for independence.

2021 Scottish Parliament
Scottish TUSC candidates stood on the regional list ballot for Glasgow, West Scotland and Highlands and Islands. 
Scottish TUSC candidates stood in Dundee West, Dundee East and Aberdeen Donside constituencies.

See also 
Socialist Party (England and Wales)
Trade Unionist and Socialist Coalition

References

External links 
 

Political party factions in Scotland
Scottish republicanism
Scottish independence
Scotland
Socialist parties in Scotland
Trotskyist organisations in the United Kingdom
Anti-austerity political parties in the United Kingdom